You Don't Know Me is a British four-part television series. It is based on the 2017 crime novel of the same name by Imran Mahmood. The first episode premiered on BBC One on 5 December 2021, with the series available to stream on BBC iPlayer following broadcast. It had an international release on Netflix on 17 June 2022.

Cast
Samuel Adewunmi as Hero
Sophie Wilde as Kyra
Bukky Bakray as Bless
Roger Nsengiyumva as Jamil
Tuwaine Barrett as Curt
Yetunde Oduwole as Adebi
Nicholas Khan as Sam
Michael Balogun as Face
Duayne Boachie as Binks

Episodes

Production

Development
It was announced in February 2020 that Snowed-In Productions would adapt Mahmood's novel for the BBC with Tom Edge as writer and Sarmad Masud as director. Jules Hussey is series producer and Rienkje Attoh is producer. Set to executive produce are Kate Crowe and Lucy Richer of the BBC as well as Ruth Kenley-Letts, Neil Blair, and Jenny Van Der Lande.

Casting
Bukky Bakray joined the cast in March 2021.

Filming
Principal photography began in February 2021 in Birmingham.

Release
First look images were revealed in May 2021. The BBC released a trailer on 16 November 2021.

References

External links

2021 British television series debuts
2021 British television series endings
2020s British crime drama television series
2020s British television miniseries
BBC crime drama television shows
Black British television shows
English-language Netflix original programming
Television shows based on British novels